Penal Sanctions (Indigenous Workers) Convention, 1939 (shelved) is  an International Labour Organization Convention.

It was established in 1939, with the preamble stating:
Having decided upon the adoption of certain proposals with regard to the progressive abolition of penal sanctions for breaches of contracts of employment by indigenous workers,...

Ratifications
Prior to it being shelved, the convention had been ratified by 33 states.

External links 
Text.
Ratifications.

Shelved International Labour Organization conventions
Treaties concluded in 1939
Treaties entered into force in 1948